Luis del Castillo Estrada, S.J. (born 21 June 1931, in Montevideo) is a Uruguayan Roman Catholic cleric.

Biography
Luis del Castillo was ordained priest on 30 July 1966 in the Society of Jesus.

On 9 April 1988 he was appointed titular bishop of Tarasa in Numidia and auxiliary bishop of Montevideo.

He was appointed Bishop of Melo on 21 December 1999, a post he held for almost a decade. He had to resign on 13 June 2009 due to illness.

References

External links

1955 births
Living people
People from Montevideo
Uruguayan Jesuits
Bishops appointed by Pope John Paul II
20th-century Roman Catholic bishops in Uruguay
21st-century Roman Catholic bishops in Uruguay
Jesuit bishops
20th-century Roman Catholic titular bishops
Uruguayan Roman Catholic bishops
Roman Catholic bishops of Montevideo
Roman Catholic bishops of Melo